Hickory Creek is a stream in Newton County in the U.S. state of Missouri. It is a tributary of Shoal Creek.

Hickory Creek was so named due to the presence of hickory timber in the area.

See also
List of rivers of Missouri

References

Rivers of Newton County, Missouri
Rivers of Missouri